Tobias Haitz (born 12 February 1992) is a German former professional footballer who played as a centre back.

He is a youth international for Germany at U19 level.

In May 2018, he announced his retirement at the age of 26.

Honours
NEC
Eerste Divisie: 2014–15

References

External links
 Voetbal International profile 
 

1992 births
Living people
Sportspeople from Aachen
German footballers
Footballers from North Rhine-Westphalia
Association football central defenders
Germany youth international footballers
Regionalliga players
Eredivisie players
Bayer 04 Leverkusen players
Bayer 04 Leverkusen II players
NEC Nijmegen players
FC Viktoria Köln players
Alemannia Aachen players
Sportfreunde Lotte players
German expatriate footballers
German expatriate sportspeople in the Netherlands
Expatriate footballers in the Netherlands